NA-105 Toba Tek Singh-I is a constituency for the National Assembly of Pakistan.

Members of Parliament

2018-2022: NA-111 Toba Tek Singh-I

Election 2002 

General elections were held on 10 Oct 2002. Amjad Ali Warriach of PML-J won by 61,746 votes.

Election 2008 

General elections were held on 18 Feb 2008. Farkhanda Amjad Warraich of PML-Q won by 69,827 votes.

Election 2013 

General elections were held on 11 May 2013. Chaudhry Khalid Javaid Warraich of PML-N won by 91,903 votes and became the  member of National Assembly.

Election 2018 
General elections were held on 25 July 2018.

See also
NA-104 Faisalabad-X
NA-106 Toba Tek Singh-II

References

External links
 Election result's official website

NA-092